Larkhall is a town in South Lanarkshire, Scotland, around  southeast of Glasgow. It is twinned with Seclin in northern France.

Larkhall sits on high ground between the River Clyde to the East and the Avon Water to the West. Larkhall sits on the edge of the scenic Clyde valley and is  a commuter town for Glasgow.
Larkhall had a population of 14,951 in the 2011 UK Census, and is a typical Scottish former industrial town. Traditionally a mining, weaving and textile area, most of Larkhall's traditional industries have now closed down, including the Lanarkshire ironworks.

Toponym
The name Larkhall or Laverock Ha first appears in journals around 1620. The origins of the name are unknown, although Laverock is the Scots word for skylark. However, there is no evidence that the town is named after the bird. It is more likely that Laverock was a surname.
The name for Larkhall was originally a Scots word Laverockhaugh (Laverockha), which meant laverock - skylark and haugh - boggy/wet area.

History
The viaduct is in a state of disrepair since the closure of the railway line in 1965 
and is closed to public access for safety reasons. In the 1990s, the viaduct was under the threat of dismantling but was protected by a local heritage group. The viaduct is Category B listed. It is currently on the Buildings at Risk Register for Scotland.

Glenview memorial fountain is a local fountain and artwork in the town, originally produced by the Saracen Foundry.

On 22 December 1999 a large gas explosion took place in the town which resulted in the death of four people. In Transco plc v HM Advocate Transco were subsequently found guilty of culpable homicide and fined £15 million in 2004.

Education
The primary schools in Larkhall are Machanhill Primary School, Dalserf Primary School, Glengowan Primary School, Hareleeshill Primary School, Craigbank Primary School, Netherburn Primary School and Robert Smillie Memorial Primary School. There is also a Catholic primary school, St Mary's. The town's sole secondary school is Larkhall Academy.

Religion
The Church of Scotland has most adherents at 7,416 persons (49.6% of the population). The 2011 census notes there are 1,247 Roman Catholics living in the town (8.3% of the population).

Larkhall contains eight churches: Chalmers Parish Church, The Church At The Cross, Larkhall Baptist Church, Larkhall Congregational Church, St. Machan's Parish Church, St. Mary's R.C. Church, Strutherhill Gospel Hall and Trinity Parish Church. There is also a Kingdom Hall of Jehovah's Witnesses.

Transport
Trains returned to the town in December 2005, with the opening of the new Larkhall railway station, which is a terminus on the Argyle Line. The station provides regular services to Glasgow and beyond. Merryton railway station serves the northern end of town and is also on the Argyle Line.

Larkhall also has good bus links with frequent services to Hamilton, Lanark, Motherwell, Stonehouse, Strathaven and Wishaw.

Scotland's main motorway, the M74 skirts the eastern edges of the town. Larkhall has 2 motorway intersections: Junction 7 with the A72, which is for southbound traffic only, and Junction 8 with the A71, which is for both northbound and southbound traffic. Junction 8 is known locally as Canderside Toll or The Toll. The centre of Glasgow can be reached in 20 minutes; Edinburgh is around 50 minutes away.

Location grid

Sport
Because of the Protestant majority, residents mainly support Rangers F.C., to the point where it was noted in 2008 that the colour green—which is associated with that team's rivals Celtic F.C.—is avoided by retailers. However, community leaders attributed any trouble to a small number of vandals.
A local authority study in 2017 found that sectarianism was not a major issue in the town.

The town has two Junior Football teams: Larkhall Thistle F.C. and Royal Albert F.C. although Royal Albert now play in Stonehouse, a neighbouring village while Larkhall Thistle play at Gasworks Park on Raploch Street. Royal Albert were once a full member of the Scottish Football League but now ply their trade, as do Larkhall Thistle, in the Third Division (fourth tier) of the West of Scotland Football League. Also present in the town is Larkhall United Junior Football Club.

The town also has its own 9 hole municipal Golf Course which was founded in 1909.

It also has a running club, Larkhall YMCA Harriers, whose vests are red with two white hoops.
The Harriers consist of Master ladies and men, Senior Ladies and men, Under 17s, Under 15s, Under 13s, Under 11s and Under 9s.

Notable people

Larkhall is home to snooker player and 2006 World Snooker Championship winner Graeme Dott. Previous residents include footballers Paul McStay; Jim McLean and his brother Tommy McLean come from a village called Ashgill next to Larkhall. Other high-profile former residents include actress Una McLean.

Black Lady
The black lady of Larkhall is a local ghost story. She was said to be the Indian servant of Captain Henry McNeil Hamilton, the last owner of Broomhill House who was brought to Larkhall by Captain McNeil after one of his many seafaring voyages. She was happy with her new life but her ignorance of Scottish customs made her a social outcast. The Captain forbade her to leave Broomhill House during the day. Soon she was not seen at night either and the Captain claimed she had disappeared, but locals were suspicious. She is said to have returned, as her ghostly form appeared in the windows of Broomhill House and then later in Morgan Glen. The Captain is said to have died prematurely.

When Broomhill House fell into disrepair the  door lintel was moved down to the Applebank public house on Millheugh road by a large group of men. The next day it was said to be found lying across the road from the public house. In the 1960s a team from the Tonight programme visited Larkhall as they tried to perform the first televised exorcism. The cameras were frozen over in fine weather and after filming finished the director was killed in a road crash on his way to another location. He was found with a fence post impaled in his heart..

References

 
Towns in South Lanarkshire